Kashmir is shared between India and Pakistan. Kashmiri wedding songs can therefore mean
 Weddings in India
 Hindi and Urdu wedding songs
 Pakistani wedding songs